Cobalt(II) iodide or cobaltous iodide are the inorganic compounds with the formula CoI2 and the hexahydrate CoI2(H2O)6.  These salts are the principal iodides of cobalt.

Synthesis
Cobalt(II) iodide is prepared by treating cobalt powder with gaseous hydrogen iodide.  The hydrated form CoI2.6H2O can be prepared by the reaction of cobalt(II) oxide (or related cobalt compounds) with hydroiodic acid.

Cobalt(II) iodide crystallizes in two polymorphs, the α- and β-forms. The α-polymorph consists of black hexagonal crystals, which turn dark green when exposed to air.  Under a vacuum at 500 °C, samples of α-CoI2 sublime, yielding the β-polymorph as a yellow crystals.  β-CoI2 also readily absorbs moisture from the air, converting into green hydrate. At 400 °C,  β-CoI2 reverts to the α-form.

Structures
The anhydrous salts adopt the cadmium halide structures.

The hexaaquo salt consists of separated [Co(H2O)6]2+ and iodide ions as verified crystallographically.

Reactions and applications
Anhydrous cobalt(II) iodide is sometimes used to test for the presence of water in various solvents.

Cobalt(II) iodide is used as a catalyst, e.g. in carbonylations.  It catalyzes the reaction of diketene with Grignard reagents, useful for  the synthesis of terpenoids

References

Cobalt(II) compounds
Iodides
Metal halides